Of Gods and the Undead is a 1970 Brazilian drama film directed by Ruy Guerra. It was entered into the 20th Berlin International Film Festival.

Cast
 Norma Bengell - Soledad
 Othon Bastos - The Man
 Ítala Nandi - Sereno
 Nelson Xavier - Valu
 Ruy Polanah - Urbano
 Jorge Chaia - Colonel Santana
 Freddy Kleemann - Man in White
 Mara Rúbia - Prostitute
 Milton Nascimento - Dim Dum

References

External links

1970 films
1970 drama films
1970s Portuguese-language films
Films directed by Ruy Guerra
Brazilian drama films